Miloš Kostić (born 23 November 1971) is a Slovenian professional football manager and former player. He was most recently the manager of Belgian First Division A club Sint-Truiden.

Honours

Player
Gorica
Slovenian PrvaLiga: 1995–96
Slovenian Supercup: 1996

References

External links

Living people
1971 births
Footballers from Ljubljana
Slovenian footballers
NK Svoboda Ljubljana  players
ND Gorica players
NK Olimpija Ljubljana (1945–2005) players
Association football defenders
Slovenian football managers
Expatriate football managers in Bosnia and Herzegovina
Expatriate football managers in Greece
Expatriate football managers in Albania
Expatriate football managers in Belgium
Premier League of Bosnia and Herzegovina managers
Kategoria Superiore managers
Belgian Pro League managers
NK Krka managers
FK Željezničar Sarajevo managers
Acharnaikos F.C. managers
Iraklis Thessaloniki F.C. managers
Luftëtari Gjirokastër managers
Trikala F.C. managers
Sint-Truidense V.V. managers